São José de Ribamar Esporte Clube, commonly known as São José, is a Brazilian football club based in São José de Ribamar, Maranhão state.

History
The club was founded on June 14, 2007. The club finished as runners-up in the 2007 Campeonato Maranhense Second Level, losing the competition to Itinga, and finished in the third position in the 2008 Taça Cidade de São Luís.

Stadium

São José de Ribamar Esporte Clube play their home games at Estádio Nhozinho Santos, in São Luís. The stadium has a maximum capacity of 16,500 people.

References

Association football clubs established in 2007
Football clubs in Maranhão
2007 establishments in Brazil